Stephen John Bicknell (born 28 November 1959) is an English former professional footballer who played in the Football League for Leicester City and Torquay United.

Bicknell was born in Stockton, Warwickshire and began his career as an apprentice winger with Leicester City, turning professional in December 1976. After a bright start to his Leicester career he failed to make the league side the following season, and in August 1978 joined Torquay United on a free transfer. His Gulls career never took off, and after only three league appearances (all as a substitute) he left for VS Rugby and later played for Southam United.

References

1959 births
Living people
People from Stratford-on-Avon District
English footballers
Association football wingers
Leicester City F.C. players
Torquay United F.C. players
Rugby Town F.C. players
Southam United F.C. players
English Football League players